Tampering with Asylum is a 2003 book by Father Frank Brennan.

The Australia Government denied the MV Tampa ship, and asylum seekers it had rescued, permission to dock at the nearest landfall of Christmas Island (see Tampa affair). Brennan argues that this response by the Howard government was a "massive overreaction".

The book was launched at the National Press Club (Australia), on 5 November 2003, and won a 2004 Gleebooks Prize.

References

2003 non-fiction books
Books about politics of Australia